Dmitri Kozlov may refer to:
 Dmitri Anatolyevich Kozlov (b. 1984), Russian footballer
 Dmitri Ilyich Kozlov (1919 - 2009), Russian aerospace engineer
  Dmitry N. Kozlov (b. 1972), Russian-German mathematician
 Dmitri Timofeyevich Kozlov (1896 - 1967), Soviet military commander in the World War II